Rahe Bipayan (literally Endless Path), is a 2007 television series broadcast by the IRIB network. The Director, producer and script-writer are Homayoun Assadian, Mostafa Azizi, and Ali Reza Bazrafshan. The show is very popular with television viewers in Iran and a notable point of Rahe Bipayan is the performance of Farhad Aslani as Akbar Abolhassani.

Cast
Atila Pesyani as Behzad Toutounchi
Farhad Aslani as Akbar Abolhassani
Mehrdad Ziaee as Kamran Saremi
Houman Seyyedi as Mansour Pourvatan
Azadeh Samadi as Ghazal Toutounchi
Bita Saharkhiz as Mina
Mahboubeh Bayat as Monir
Mehran Rajabi as Mikaeel
Babak Behshad as Vahid
Saeed Pirdoust as Abolhassani's friend
Hamid Mahindoust as Saeed Tamaddon
Ala Mohseni as Behdouj

External links
 

Iranian television series
2000s Iranian television series
2007 Iranian television series debuts
2007 Iranian television series endings
Islamic Republic of Iran Broadcasting original programming
Persian-language television shows